Kingfisher is a city in and the county seat of Kingfisher County, Oklahoma,. The population was 4,903 at the time of the 2020 census. It is the former home and namesake of Kingfisher College. According to the Encyclopedia of Oklahoma History and Culture, Kingfisher is now primarily a bedroom community for people employed in Enid and Oklahoma City.

History

Kingfisher came into existence on April 22, 1889, when land owned by the federal government was opened to settlement by "land run". A huge area in what is now central Oklahoma was literally "peopled" by Americans overnight. The city is situated on a part of the Chisholm Trail, over which millions of Texas longhorns were driven to railheads in Kansas in the years immediately following the Civil War. Extension of the railroads and settlement of the open range ended this colorful era.

The town was named for an early resident who several landmarks were named for, a man named King Fisher.

Settlers in the Kingfisher area formed two communities: Kingfisher City, on the north side of the settlement, and Lisbon, on the south side. The two merged on June 14, 1890, and the resulting town was named Kingfisher. Oklahoma Territory was organized May 2, 1890, and consisted of the Unassigned Lands and the Panhandle. The Western District included present-day Kingfisher County, part of Canadian County and the Panhandle. Abraham Jefferson Seay, a Missouri native, was appointed as District Judge and moved to Kingfisher. In 1892, Seay was appointed as the second territorial governor by President Benjamin Harrison.

Railroads helped with Kingfisher’s growth: the Chicago, Kansas and Nebraska Railway (later part of the Rock Island) built through the area, the first passenger train arriving on October 23, 1889.  In 1900, the Guthrie and Kingfisher Railway -- also later part of the Rock Island-- built east from Kingfisher, while the Guthrie and Western Railway-- an affiliate of the Santa Fe Railroad-- built west from Seward, Oklahoma, meeting at a point that became Cashion, Oklahoma, and giving Kingfisher access to the territorial capitol of Guthrie and the Santa Fe system.  The Kingfisher to Seward line was abandoned in pieces in 1934 and 1937, but Kingfisher still has freight rail service on what is now the Union Pacific Railroad.

The Kingfisher County Development Foundation was created in 1958 for the purpose of assisting and promoting industrial, economic and civic growth within, and surrounding the Kingfisher area of Oklahoma.A present K.C.D.F. strategy includes the investment for development of the Kingfisher Industrial Park. The industrial park is located just south of Kingfisher, further closing the gap between Oklahoma City and Kingfisher. Kingfisher has quickly become a suburban community of the Oklahoma City Metropolitan Statistical Area, already home to many commuters to Oklahoma City. Kingfisher is a Certified City and has received a Community Development Block Grant to inventory infrastructure features for Capital Improvement Planning (CIP).

On August 19, 2007, the city was 25% flooded when Kingfisher Creek and Uncle John Creek overflowed their banks, the result of heavy rain from Tropical Depression Erin. One woman died in the flood.

The Coleman Company was founded in Kingfisher by W. C. Coleman in 1900.

Geography
U.S. Route 81 (Main Street) passes through the center of town, leading north  to Enid and south  to El Reno. Oklahoma State Highway 3 (Broadway Avenue) crosses US 81 in the center of town, leading east  to Guthrie and west  to Watonga.

The city is drained by Kingfisher Creek, a northeast-flowing tributary of the Cimarron River.

Climate

Demographics

As of the census of 2010, there were 4,633 people, 1,804 households, and 1,217 families residing in the city. The racial makeup of the city was 83.9% White, 1.6% African American, 3.8% Native American, 0.5% Asian, 6.9% from other races, and 3.3% from two or more races. Hispanic or Latino of any race were 12.4% of the population.

There were 1,804 households, out of which 28.4% had children under the age of 18 living with them, 51.5% were married couples living together, 10.6% had a female householder with no husband present, and 32.5% were non-families while 29.2% of all households were made up of individuals. The average household size was 2.5 and the average family size was 3.06. The median age was 37 years. 52.1% of the population was female and 47.9% male.

As of the 2013 American Community Survey, the median income for a household in the city was $49,727, and the median income for a family was $59,408. Males had a median full-time income of $49,444 versus $32,996 for females. The per capita income for the city was $24,363. About 7.7% of families and 5.8% of the population were below the poverty line, including 7.9% of those under age 18 and 9.6% of those age 65 or over.

Places of interest
Kingfisher's only permanent tourist attraction is the Chisholm Trail Museum, which houses the Gov. Seay Mansion. This facility preserves relics and information of the community's unique heritage.

Government
Kingfisher has a commission-manager government.

Notable people
 George S. Benson, missionary, college administrator, conservative political activist and segregationist
 Don Blanding, poet
 Sol Butler, pioneering black Olympian and 1920s NFL player
 Arthur A. Collins, founder of Collins Radio Company
 Elmer Crumbley, jazz trombonist 
 Erna P. Harris, journalist
 Curtis Lofton, NFL linebacker for the Oakland Raiders
 Carl Mays, MLB pitcher, 4-time World Series champion
 Joe Redington, founder of the Iditarod Sled Dog Race
 Abraham Jefferson Seay, Associate Justice of the Oklahoma Territorial Supreme Court and second Governor of Oklahoma Territory
 Jace Sternberger, American football player
 James "Bud" Walton, co-founder of Wal-Mart
 Sam Walton, founder of Wal-Mart

References

External links

 Official website
 Chisholm Trail Museum
 Kingfisher Chamber of Commerce
 Oklahoma Digital Maps: Digital Collections of Oklahoma and Indian Territory

Cities in Oklahoma
Cities in Kingfisher County, Oklahoma
County seats in Oklahoma
Populated places established in 1889
1889 establishments in Indian Territory